The Century Towers is the first residential project constructed in Century City, Los Angeles, in the U.S. state of California.  The buildings were developed under the aegis of Alcoa Properties, and they are located along the southern boundary of Century City on the Avenue of the Stars.

History
Built in 1964 by Alcoa, William Zeckendorf, and Welton Becket Associates, the Century Towers was originally designed as apartments by architect I.M. Pei. Perhaps best known for the "Pyramide du Louvre," his landmark glass pyramid addition to the Louvre Museum (Paris, France), Pei brought his signature styling to the creation of the mid-century towers. The towers were converted to condominiums in 1973, by S. Jon Kreedman & Company.
The development also includes a swimming pool, gymnasium, putting green, and tennis courts.

Celebrity residents
The Century Towers has been home to many celebrities and notables over the years. Those include Michael Douglas, Catherine Zeta-Jones, Burt Lancaster, Lana Turner, David Janssen, Jack Benny, Sebastian Siegel, Diana Ross, Karen Carpenter (who purchased two condos and converted them into her own duplex in 1976), Edith Flagg and Josh Flagg, Ruth Handler (founder of Mattel) and Berry Gordy. David Janssen's widow Dani is known for an annual Oscar party thrown in her penthouse.

References

1964 establishments in California
Century City, Los Angeles
I. M. Pei buildings
Residential buildings completed in 1964
Residential buildings in Los Angeles
Residential condominiums in the United States
Twin towers